Jesse Smith (born April 27, 1983) is an American water polo utility player. He was an All-American at Pepperdine University. Smith is a 2008 Olympic silver medalist and a five-time Olympian (2004, 2008, 2012, 2016, 2020). He played for Panathinaikos in Greece.

Career

High school
Smith played water polo for Coronado High School. He helped the team win three San Diego Section CIF Division II titles from 1998 to 2000. He was named the San Diego Union Tribune Player of the Year in 1999 and 2000.

College
Smith then played for Pepperdine University. He was named to the All-American first team in 2002 and 2004. In 2003, he led Pepperdine with 55 goals.

International
At the 2003 Pan American Games, Smith scored in three games and helped the U.S. win the tournament. At the 2004 Summer Olympics, he scored nine goals. The U.S. finished seventh. Smith scored six goals in the 2005 FINA World Championships, but the U.S. finished in 11th place.

Smith, who scored eight goals, was a member of the team that won a gold medal at the 2007 Pan American Games. He was also a member of the teams that finished fifth in both the 2006 and 2007 FINA World League Super Finals. At the 2008 Summer Olympics, Smith scored three goals and helped win a silver medal for the U.S.

In 2009, Smith played on the U.S. fourth-place teams at the World Super League Final and World Championships. The U.S. also finished fourth in the 2010 FINA World Cup. In the 2011 Pan American Games, Smith scored six goals, as the U.S. won the gold medal in that tournament again. He scored three goals at the 2012 Summer Olympics; the U.S. finished eighth.

Professional
Smith has played professionally for Greece's Ethnikos Piraeus, Olympiacos Piraeus, Egypt's Gezira, Turkey's Galatasaray, Italy's Savona and Montenegro's Jadran Herceg Novi.

Personal
Smith was born in Kailua, Hawaii, on April 27, 1983. He lives in Thousand Oaks, California. He is 6 feet, 4 inches tall.

Smith is married and has two sons, Brooks and Samuel. His father played water polo at Coronado High School. His brother played water polo at Stanford.

See also
 List of Olympic medalists in water polo (men)
 List of players who have appeared in multiple men's Olympic water polo tournaments

References

External links
 

1983 births
Living people
Sportspeople from Hawaii
American male water polo players
Water polo utility players
Water polo players at the 2004 Summer Olympics
Water polo players at the 2008 Summer Olympics
Water polo players at the 2012 Summer Olympics
Water polo players at the 2016 Summer Olympics
Water polo players at the 2020 Summer Olympics
Medalists at the 2008 Summer Olympics
Olympic silver medalists for the United States in water polo
Water polo players at the 2007 Pan American Games
Water polo players at the 2011 Pan American Games
Water polo players at the 2015 Pan American Games
Water polo players at the 2019 Pan American Games
Pan American Games medalists in water polo
Pan American Games gold medalists for the United States
Pepperdine Waves athletes
Olympiacos Water Polo Club players
Panathinaikos Water Polo Club players
Medalists at the 2011 Pan American Games
Medalists at the 2015 Pan American Games
Medalists at the 2019 Pan American Games
Galatasaray S.K. (men's water polo) players
Ethnikos Piraeus Water Polo Club players